Tropical sage is a common name for several plants and may refer to:

Salvia coccinea, with red flowers
Salvia misella, with blue flowers
Salvia splendens, with red flowers